Alborn is an unincorporated community in Alborn Township, Saint Louis County, Minnesota, United States.

The community of Alborn is located 29 miles northwest of the city of Duluth; and five miles west of U.S. 53 at Independence. Nearby places include Prosit, Culver, Burnett, Brookston, and Independence.

The center of Alborn is generally considered at the junction of Saint Louis County Highway 7 (CR 7) and County Highway 47 (CR 47); located in the eastern portion of Alborn Township (population 460).  The Artichoke River flows through the community.

Local business establishments include the Clip Joint Bar and Grill.

See also
 Alborn Township

References

 Rand McNally Road Atlas – 2007 edition – Minnesota entry
 Official State of Minnesota Highway Map – 2011/2012 edition
 Mn/DOT map of Saint Louis County – Sheet 1 – 2011 edition

Unincorporated communities in Minnesota
Unincorporated communities in St. Louis County, Minnesota